Yanchenko or Yanchanka/Jančanka is a surname. Notable people with the surname include:

 Aleksandr Yanchenko (born 1995), Belarusian footballer
 Halyna Yanchenko (born 1988), Ukrainian politician
 Oleh Yanchenko (born 1979), Ukrainian diver
 Vasili Yanchenko (1894–1959), Russian flying ace

See also
 

Belarusian-language surnames
Ukrainian-language surnames